Ron Labinski (December 7, 1937 – January 1, 2023) was an American architect, notable for influential designs of stadiums for professional baseball and football. Focusing for much of his career on sports venues, Labinski was instrumental in establishing sports and assembly venue design as architectural specialties. Labinski's work led to the establishment of several such specialized firms in Kansas City, composed of many of Labinski's former colleagues, making Kansas City the center of sports-related design. Labinski has been described as the world's first sports venue architect.

Early life
Ronald Joseph Labinski was born on December 7, 1937, in Buffalo, New York. He was the son of Raymond and Bertha Labinski, the second of four siblings. His father was a wholesale food salesman. During Labinski's childhood the family moved to Cleveland and Chicago. Showing an interest in architecture from an early age, Labinski remembered drawing Ebbetts Field as a child, foreshadowing his career. He graduated from Parma Senior High School in 1955. He graduated from the University of Illinois Urbana-Champaign with a Bachelor of Architecture degree. Following graduation in 1962 he studied  in Europe on a fellowship for six months, then served in the U.S. Army for two years as an engineer at Fort Riley, Kansas.

Early career

After leaving the Army, Labinski worked for an architectural firm in Kansas City designing hospitals. In the early 1970s Labinski worked for the Kansas City architecture firm Kivett and Myers, participating in the design of Arrowhead Stadium with project designer Charles Deaton. Arrowhead was one of the first of a wave of stadiums specifically built for football, supplanting previously-popular configurations that attempted to accommodate multiple sports. Following work as a consultant for Rich Stadium in Buffalo and as project architect for Giants Stadium, Labinski became a partner in Devine, James, Labinski & Myers (DJLM) in 1973. Seeing a potential market in stadium design as older stadiums became obsolete, Labinski compiled a list of venues and owners that became the basis for a marketing program that gained him access to sports industry figures and their insights.  Using Labinski's design concepts, DJLM submitted a proposal to design the Hoosier Dome in Indianapolis, losing to HNTB. However, Hoosier Dome investors were sufficiently impressed by Labinski to require HNTB to hire Labinski and five DJLM colleagues for the project, becoming  the nucleus for a sports architecture studio within HNTB.

Sports design

After three years with HNTB, Labinski and several HNTB colleagues moved to the new Kansas City office of St. Louis-based HOK, forming HOK Sport in 1983 (later spun off after Labinski's retirement, and rebranded as Populous). Thirteen of fourteen of HNTB's sports clients followed Labinski to HOK. 

At HOK Sport, Labinski was instrumental in moving the design of large sports stadiums from multi-purpose facililites to specialized venues optimized for single sports, with a strong sense of place. The most influential of these was Oriole Park at Camden Yards in Baltimore, which incorporated existing buildings and framed views of the field's surroundings. With Labinski as HOK project principal and Joseph Spear as project architect, the Oriole Park project was derived from the design concept Labinski developed for Pilot Field in Buffalo, and integrated with a design concept  developed by Orioles architect and planner Janet Marie Smith and RTKL Associates. 

Joe Robbie Stadium marked the first use if club seating, a concept Labinski originated that provided an enhanced revenue stream for stadium owners.

Other stadium designs overseen by Labinski and his group at HOK Sport included Jacobs Field in Cleveland and Oracle Park in San Francisco, where Labinski advocated for the stadium's signature relationship with San Francisco Bay.

Labinski was elected as a member of the American Institute of Architects College of Fellows in 1994.

Personal life
A first marriage ended in divorce. Labinski retired from active design work in 2000. He died January 1, 2023, of frontotemporal dementia at a care facility in Prairie View, Missouri, at age 85. Survivors included his wife, Lee Beougher Labinski, and two children.

Projects
Labinski designed or participated in many stadium projects:

 Arrowhead Stadium (1972), Kansas City
 Giants Stadium (1976, demolished 2010), New Jersey
 Hoosier Dome (1984, demolished 2009 as the RCA Dome), Indianapolis
 Joe Robbie Stadium (1985), now Hard Rock Stadium, Miami
 Pilot Field (1988), now Sahlen Field, Buffalo
 Oriole Park at Camden Yards (1992), Baltimore
 Jacobs Field (1994), now Progressive Field, Cleveland
 Coors Field (1995), Denver, Colorado
 TIAA Bank Field (1995 as Jacksonville Municipal Stadium), Jacksonville, Florida
 Bank of America Stadium (1996 as Ericsson Stadium), Charlotte
 Raymond James Stadium (1998), Tampa, Florida
 M&T Bank Stadium (1998 as Ravens Stadium), Baltimore
 Oracle Park (2000 as Pacific Bell Park), San Francisco

References

1937 births
2023 deaths
Architects from Buffalo, New York
20th-century American architects
Fellows of the American Institute of Architects
University of Illinois School of Architecture alumni